Randy Powell is an American politician who served as a Republican member of the Kansas House of Representatives from 2015 to 2018. He represented the 30th District and lived in Olathe, Kansas. 

Powell was elected in 2014, after incumbent Republican Lance Kinzer declined to run for re-election. The primary election pitted Powell against Ron Worley, a former representative for the 30th district who had lost a primary to Kinzer in 2012. Worley was defeated once again, with Powell triumphing with 55% of the primary election vote. The general election was decided by a similar margin, with Powell defeating Democrat Liz Dickinson 57% to 43%. The 2016 results were similar, with Powell winning the primary with 60% of the vote and beating Democrat Darla Graham in the general, 52% to 48%.

Powell declined to run for re-election in 2018, and was succeeded by Democrat Brandon Woodard.

Personal Life
Powell was born and raised in Kansas. He married his wife Lupita in 1984, and the couple has three children (Kathleen, Joseph and Michael). Powell is a Christian and is active in his church.

References

Living people
Year of birth missing (living people)
Republican Party members of the Kansas House of Representatives
21st-century American politicians
Politicians from Olathe, Kansas
Christians from Kansas